The Central Highlands is the name given for the string of mountains and volcanoes which run through the middle of Central America. The highlands are part of a circle of volcanoes known as the Pacific Ring of Fire that runs through Japan, New Zealand, the Americas, and rims the entire Pacific Ocean. The central highlands in Colombia are mostly volcanoes

Regions of Central America
Highlands